Oleg Pavlovich Kopayev (28 November 1937 – 3 April 2010) was a Soviet football player.

Honours
 Soviet Top League runner-up: 1966.
 Grigory Fedotov club member.
 Soviet Top League top scorer: 1963 (27 goals), 1965 (18 goals).
 Top 33 players year-end list: three times.

International career
Kopayev made his debut for USSR on 21 November 1965 in a friendly against Brazil starring Pelé.

External links
  Profile

1937 births
2010 deaths
People from Yelets
Russian footballers
Soviet footballers
Soviet Union international footballers
PFC CSKA Moscow players
FC SKA Rostov-on-Don players
SKA Lviv players
Soviet Top League players
1964 European Nations' Cup players
Association football forwards
Sportspeople from Lipetsk Oblast